The year 1750 in science and technology involved some significant events.

Astronomy
 Thomas Wright suggests that the Milky Way Galaxy is a disk-shaped system of stars with the Solar System near the centre.

Exploration
 April 1 – Pehr Osbeck sets out on a primarily botanical expedition to China.

Physics
 January 17 – John Canton reads a paper before the Royal Society on a method of making artificial magnets.
 Approx. date – Leonhard Euler and Daniel Bernoulli develop the Euler–Bernoulli beam equation.

Technology
 November 18 – Westminster Bridge across the River Thames in London, designed by the Swiss-born engineer Charles Labelye, is officially opened.

Publications
 Historia Plantarum, originally written by Conrad Gessner between 1555 and 1565.

Awards
 Copley Medal: George Edwards

Births
 March 16 – Caroline Herschel, German-born English astronomer (died 1848)
 July 2 – François Huber, Swiss naturalist (died 1831)
 July 5 – Ami Argand, Genevan physicist and chemist (died 1803)
 September 22 – Christian Konrad Sprengel, German botanist (died 1816)
 October 25 – Marie Le Masson Le Golft, French naturalist (died 1826) 
 Aaron Arrowsmith, English cartographer (died 1823)
 Jean Nicolas Fortin, French physicist and instrument maker who invented a portable mercury barometer in 1800 (died 1831)

Deaths
 December 1 – Johann Gabriel Doppelmayr, German mathematician, astronomer, and cartographer (born 1677)

References

 
18th century in science
1750s in science